Milichiella lacteipennis is a species of freeloader flies in the family Milichiidae.

References

Milichiidae
Articles created by Qbugbot
Insects described in 1866